Paul M. Schimpf (born 1971) is an American lawyer and former Republican member of the Illinois Senate from the 58th district from 2017 to 2021.

Among his activities prior to his tenure as State Senator, Schimpf served in the U.S. Marine Corps, participated in the trial of Saddam Hussein, and was the Republican nominee for Illinois Attorney General in 2014.

Schimpf was a candidate for the Republican nomination for governor in the 2022 Illinois gubernatorial election.

Early life and education
Schimpf, the son of two school teachers, was born in 1971 at Scott Air Force Base and raised in Waterloo, Illinois. He was the valedictorian of his high school senior class and was a National Merit Scholar. Schimpf attended the United States Naval Academy – passing an engineering scholarship offer at the University of Illinois – and Southern Illinois University School of Law.

Career
Schimpf served as an officer in the U.S. Marine Corps, rising to the rank of lieutenant colonel. He was commissioned as a second lieutenant in 1993 and retired in May 2013.

In 2005, Schimpf was deployed to Iraq to serve as the chief American advisor to prosecutors in the trial of Saddam Hussein.

Schimpf served as a member of the legislative staff of U.S. Representative John Kline of Minnesota.

2014 Illinois Attorney General campaign

Schimpf was the Republican nominee for Illinois Attorney General in 2014. Incumbent Democrat Lisa Madigan defeated him in the general election.

Illinois Senate

Schimpf ran successfully for the 58th district seat in the Illinois Senate in 2016, defeating former Lieutenant Governor Sheila Simon in the general election. He was sworn in on January 11, 2017. His district included portions of Jefferson, Perry, Randolph, St. Clair, Monroe, Jackson, Union, and Washington counties. Schimpf announced he would not run for reelection to the Illinois Senate in 2020. He was succeeded by Terri Bryant, a member of the Illinois House of Representatives and a fellow Republican.

2022 Illinois gubernatorial campaign

On February 15, 2021, Schimpf announced his candidacy for Illinois Governor in the 2022 election. His running mate was Carolyn Schofield. They came in fourth place in the primary, receiving 4.3% of the vote. Schimpf managed to only win his home county Monroe, which was one of only two counties Darren Bailey did not win.

Electoral history

Personal life
Schimpf married his wife, Lori, while attending Southern Illinois University School of Law. They live in Waterloo, Illinois and have two sons together.

References

External links
Senator Paul Schimpf (R) 58th District at the Illinois General Assembly
100th,101st
Campaign website

1971 births
Living people
21st-century American politicians
Democratic Party Illinois state senators
Democratic Party members of the Illinois House of Representatives
Military personnel from Illinois
People from Waterloo, Illinois
Southern Illinois University School of Law alumni
United States Marine Corps officers
United States Naval Academy alumni